The Whyalla Steelworks is a fully integrated steelworks and the only manufacturer of rail in Australia. Iron ore is mined in the Middleback Range to feed the steelworks, resulting in the distribution of finished steel products of over 90 different grades. It occupies a 1,000 ha site on the shore of False Bay, Spencer Gulf and is the largest employer in Whyalla, South Australia.

Approximately 1.2 million tonnes of raw steel is produced in the steelworks each year, with about 65% of that transferred by rail to Arrium's Market Mills as billets for further processing. The balance of the steel is then converted to finished products at the Whyalla Rolling Mill. These products service the construction and rail transport industries.

Dust emissions from the steelworks became a controversial topic in 2005 after legislation was rewritten to nullify a legal battle between OneSteel and the South Australian Environmental Protection Agency. The steelworks is open to the public for guided tours which can be booked at the Whyalla Visitors Centre.

History

Iron ore mining
The Whyalla Steelworks receives iron ore mined at various sites along the Middleback Range. Iron ore mining in this region dates back to at least 1900. Prior to the steelworks' construction, the ore was shipped from Whyalla (then known as Hummock Hill) to Port Pirie for use as a flux in smelters. It was later supplied to steel-making facilities at Port Kembla, New South Wales. The first shipment of iron ore by sea for Port Pirie departed Whyalla in 1903. The first mines to be developed were Iron Knob and Iron Monarch, with later developments including Iron Baron, Iron Knight, Iron Princess, Iron Chieftain and Iron Duke. The mines were developed by BHP, which went on to develop the steelworks and shipyards.

Steelworks and shipyards

The steelworks first established a plant for the production of pig-iron for sale or use at other BHP plants. The announcement was made in 1937 and South Australian legislation was prepared to facilitate the development. Water security for the project was also guaranteed by the development of the Morgan-Whyalla pipeline. The Whyalla Steelworks was opened in May 1941 with the first blast furnace 'blown in'. A shipyard was also constructed, designed to aid the British Commonwealth's efforts in World War II. After the war, the steelworks and shipyards continued to produce a range of products including rail track and maritime vessels for commercial use.

In the 1960s, a BOS rolling mills and coke ovens were constructed, enabling the Whyalla plant to become a fully integrated steelworks.

Various records were set and milestone met by the Whyalla shipyards. In 1947, Australia's largest domestically built vessel, the bulk carrier Iron Yampi, was launched. It was built for BHP Shipping to transport iron ore from Yampi Sound in Western Australia. In 1965, the honor was claimed again, when the Darling River was launched. With the launch of the tanker Arthur Phillip in 1974, the Whyalla shipyard passed a major milestone, having produced over one million tonnes of merchant vessels in total. The shipyard also produced the world's first gas turbine-electric powered ship, the Seaway Prince in 1975. BHP's shipyards continued to operate until 1978. Many of the vessels were produced for the use of BHP Shipping. The eventual closure of the shipyards came as a major blow to the town of Whyalla and plunged it into an economic recession, with 1,800 workers made redundant.

In 1982, the steelworks employed 5,000 people. In 2011, the steelworks employed 1,600 people, down from a peak of around 6,000. The steelworks is owned by Liberty House Group, who purchased Arrium in September 2017. Arrium was previously known as OneSteel, and was spun off from BHP in 2000.

Current operations
The iron-making department incorporates the blast furnace, coke ovens and the power and services departments of the Whyalla steelworks. Molten iron is supplied from here to the BOS for manufacture into steel. Coke is produced on site from coal supplied to the plant from Newcastle or Port Kembla and ships are loaded with iron ore for shipment from Whyalla's port. Finished steel products are distributed by sea, road and rail.

In 2020, the slip at the former shipyard was recommissioned as a facility to decommission, scrap and recycle (DSR) large ships. The first ship through the facility was the former . The initial deconstruction work was done by McMahon Services at Port Pirie before the hull was moved across Spencer Gulf to Whyalla.

As of 2021, the interests of the works' owners, GFG Alliance, are represented to the South Australian parliament by lobbying firm, Bespoke Approach.

Steelworks development
 Blast Furnace No.1 was built between 1938 and 1941, blown in 1941, relined in 1965, closed in 1981 and demolished 1997.
 Blast Furnace No.2 was built in 1965, relined 1981 and again in 2004.
 The Boilerhouse was built in 1941 with 3 boilers. Boiler No.4 was added in 1950 and Nos. 5 and 6 in the late 1960s. Only Nos. 5 and 6 remain in full-time operation, with No.4 on standby.
 The Salt Water Pump House was built in 1941 with 3 salt water pumps with another 3 pumps added later. Only 5 remain, with No.1 now serving as a backup diesel pump.
 The Coke Ovens were built in the 1960s with 2 batteries. Another battery was added in the 1980s.
 A 1.5 GL reverse osmosis seawater desalination plant was commissioned in December 2011.

Vessels built at Whyalla shipyards

Electricity supply
The Broken Hill Proprietary Company (BHP) was responsible for bringing electricity to the townships of Iron Knob, Whyalla, their associated mines and ultimately the Whyalla steelworks. This was achieved by the construction of three powerhouses and network infrastructure to reticulate the power.

BHP commenced power supply to Whyalla in 1908 and Iron Knob in 1922. A second powerhouse was built in the 1920s to replace the first and was decommissioned in late 1941 (though it was still standing in the 1990s). The third powerhouse was built in 1941 as part of the No.1 Blast furnace. It features two turbo alternators and two turbo blowers and remains in operation. It provides electricity for use around the plant and air to the blast furnace. Compressed air is also utilised around the plant by a number of other departments.

The South Australian grid, run by the then Electricity Trust of South Australia (ETSA), was extended to Whyalla by the late 1950s. While the town's supply was progressively transferred to ETSA during the 1960s, BHP continued to supply much of its own needs and those of some other customers that were not economic to transfer to the ETSA network. As BHP's power needs grew it began to use grid power for a greater portion of its own needs. However, as of 2016 the steelworks continues to generate its own electricity to lower its energy costs and increase security of supply.

As of 2005, the Whyalla Steelworks has 66.5 MW of dedicated electricity generating capacity on-site. 57.5 MW of this capacity consists of three turbo alternators driven by steam raised in various boilers, fired primarily by waste blast furnace and coke oven gases. The boilers can also be fired with supplementary fuel oil and natural gas. The boilers also provide steam for process use around the plant. Two 4.2 MW gas turbines operate exclusively on purchased natural gas. Despite this on-site capacity, the plant relies on purchased electricity for a substantial portion of its needs, and only exports power to the grid occasionally. Plans for the associated 280 MW Cultana Solar Farm was abandoned in 2021.

Water supply

The Whyalla Steelworks draws the majority of its required water from the Murray River, via the Morgan-Whyalla pipeline. In December 2011, a reverse osmosis seawater desalination plant was commissioned. Capable of producing 1.5 GL of water per year, the plant allows Arrium to reduce Murray River water consumption by up to 25%. The brine from the plant is discharged into settling ponds which flow into the waters of False Bay, Spencer Gulf.

Railways

A rail network exists within the steelworks. Built as a narrow gauge network, it was converted to standard gauge in the 1960s. In 1901, a line opened from Whyalla to Iron Knob. In 1930, a branch opened from Middleton Junction to Iron Baron. The latter closed in 1947 being reopened in 1958. In 1990, it was extended 40 kilometres from Iron Baron to Iron Duke. After iron ore production ceased at Iron Baron in 1991 and Iron Duke in 1998, the line from Middleton Junction closed. With the reopening of the Iron Baron Mine in mid-2012, the line reopened to Iron Baron.

In October 1972, the 74 kilometre Whyalla railway line opened primarily to serve the Whyalla Steelworks.

Red dust controversy

Dust emissions from the Whyalla steelworks have been considered as a potential cause of elevated lung cancer incidence among residents of Whyalla. Between 1999 and 2004, 95 cases of lung cancer were recorded - 32 more than the Government of South Australia's Department of Health anticipated based on studies of other regions in the state. Concerns regarding emissions and their health impacts came to a head between 2005 and 2007, largely due to the efforts of Ted Kittel and the community-lead Whyalla Red Dust Action Group. Residents of East Whyalla and students of the Whyalla Town Primary School are believed to be worst impacted by the dust emissions due to their proximity to the source. The public controversy was predicated by a legal case heard in the Environment, Resources and Development Court in 2005, EPA v. OneSteel. The case evaporated after OneSteel successfully renegotiated the terms of their governing Indenture Act, with the support of the Government of South Australia.

OneSteel's response
OneSteel responded by incorporating new processes into the design of Project Magnet. By proposing to transport ore from the Iron Duke mine in a slurry pipeline, the company hoped to reduce opportunities for the emission of excessive red dust. The project was supported by acting Premier Kevin Foley who espoused the project's economic merits. The project represented a $395 million investment in the development of Whyalla's economy with coincidental environmental benefits. The plan was to be implemented by 2008. The company also engages in the assessment and remediation of buildings in the town of Whyalla, with results and other emissions statistics published in The Whyalla News.

Political response
Greens MLC Mark Parnell openly criticised the government for initially relaxing the EPA licensing conditions on dust emissions by modifying the company's Indenture Act after significant breaches were recorded in 2005.

The Australian Democrats' leader Sandra Kanck was critical of the removal of the Minister for the Environment from the role of overseeing emissions licensing for OneSteel. The party was concerned that the sole ministerial responsibility for the company's emissions was now left in the hands of the Minister for Mineral Resources.

At the time, Premier Mike Rann was critical of the EPA, describing it as a 'toothless tiger... because it didn't have the backing of government, it didn't have independence'.

As public and political pressure persisted, the Government eventually modified the licensing conditions for the facility's allowable airborne pollution emissions. This included reducing the number of days per year that excessive dust was permitted. In 2006, 29 days of 'excessive dust' were recorded. The changed conditions would limit breaches to 10 days in 2008, and ultimately 5 days in 2011. Additional breaches could incur a fine of up to $120,000. The company was required to report monthly to the Government of South Australia with emissions reports and details of any remedial actions taken.

Resolution
Despite describing their 'journey' with Whyalla's dust-affected community as 'reactive', 'very closed door', and 'adversarial', OneSteel eventually worked with the Whyalla Red Dust Action Group and sustainability consultants to address the community’s issues and work towards a feasible solution. OneSteel believes that Project Magnet was successful in addressing the red dust issue, mainly through the company’s introduction of a wet crushing process in 2007. Since then, OneSteel has attempted to further reduce its dust emissions and works with council and community groups to improve the visual appearance of dust-impacted areas in Whyalla.

The WRDAG was disbanded in 2010 after agreement that the red dust issue had been addressed. Former chair of the WRDAG, Ted Kittel, stated “The problem is resolved with a fair and reasonable outcome. I believe that OneSteel has now set a benchmark in the way it addresses environmental issues and in the excellent way it now communicates with the community.”

See also
Whyalla Barson

References

Further reading
 (OneSteel lost $195m in the 2018 financial year.)

External links

Ironworks and steelworks in Australia
Shipbuilding companies of Australia
Industrial buildings in South Australia
Whyalla
Manufacturing plants in Australia